Oregon Route 250 (OR 250) is an Oregon state highway running from Cape Blanco State Park to OR 101 near Sixes. OR 250 is known as the Cape Blanco Highway No. 250 (see Oregon highways and routes).

OR 250 was established in 2002 as part of Oregon's project to assign route numbers to highways that previously were not assigned, and, as of August 2008, was unsigned.

Route description 

OR 250 begins at the west boundary of Cape Blanco State Park and heads east to an intersection with US 101 one mile (1.6 km) south of Sixes, where it ends.

History 

OR 250 was assigned to the Cape Blanco Highway in 2002.

Major intersections

References 
 Oregon Department of Transportation, Descriptions of US and Oregon Routes, https://web.archive.org/web/20051102084300/http://www.oregon.gov/ODOT/HWY/TRAFFIC/TEOS_Publications/PDF/Descriptions_of_US_and_Oregon_Routes.pdf, page 28.
 Oregon Department of Transportation, Cape Blanco Highway No. 250, ftp://ftp.odot.state.or.us/tdb/trandata/maps/slchart_pdfs_1980_to_2002/Hwy250_2000.pdf

250
Transportation in Curry County, Oregon